Euphorbia rossii is a species of plant in the family Euphorbiaceae. It is endemic to Madagascar.  Its natural habitat is rocky areas. It is threatened by habitat loss. 
It has reddish-yellow cyathia.

References

Endemic flora of Madagascar
rossii
Vulnerable plants
Taxonomy articles created by Polbot